Ernst Peterson Hay (1886 – 13 December 1955) was a New Zealand lawyer and judge who was the Mayor of Lower Hutt from 1947 to 1949.

Biography
He was born in Lawrence in 1886 to William Hay. He was educated at Lawrence District High School and later became an assistant solicitor at the Public Trust Office in 1910. He was later a lawyer at the Wellington firm of Mazengarb, Hay and Macalister (founded 1918) with Ossie Mazengarb and Robert Macalister. He was also the President of the Wellington Rotary Club in 1939. During World War II Hay acted as chairman of the Armed Forces Appeal Board at Wellington. He was married to Agnes Mitchell with whom he had two sons and three daughters. His brother was Christchurch businessman and city councillor Sir James Hay.

He was a member of the Lower Hutt Borough Council from 1938 to 1947. In June 1947 the mayor, Jack Andrews, resigned and the councillors elected Hay as mayor for the remainder of the term until the scheduled election in November. He was re-elected mayor at the November 1947 election. In 1948 he was appointed as a Judge of the Supreme Court of New Zealand. After joining the judiciary he resigned as mayor on 20 January 1949.

He retired in February 1955, owing to illness, and later died on 13 December that year. Hi wife Agnes, who was a benefactor and volunteer for the Red Cross and Women's Guild, died in 1959.

Notes

References

1886 births
1955 deaths
People from Lawrence, New Zealand
Mayors of Lower Hutt
20th-century New Zealand politicians
Hutt City Councillors
20th-century New Zealand lawyers
20th-century New Zealand judges
High Court of New Zealand judges